Twin Falls High School is a public secondary school in Twin Falls, Idaho, one of two traditional high schools operated by the Twin Falls School District.

School history
Twin Falls High School was founded in 1907. Citizens passed a bond in 1909 to construct the high school building and a supplemental bond in 1911 to complete construction. Formal dedication of the original high school, located on Shoshone Street next to the Twin Falls County Courthouse, occurred in February 1912.

The current Twin Falls High School on Filer Avenue opened in September 1954. The original high school building became Twin Falls Junior High School (now O'Leary Middle School). The original building was condemned and torn down in the early 1980s after O'Leary moved to a new location in 1979.

Athletics
Until 2009, TFHS was among the largest high schools in the state, classified as 5A (enrollment over 1,280 students) by the IHSAA. With the opening of Canyon Ridge High School in western Twin Falls in August 2009, both schools were classified as 4A (four-year enrollment between 640 and 1,279). A crosstown rivalry between TFHS and CRHS has since developed.

With the move to down to 4A in 2009, TFHS also changed conferences. It is currently a member of the Great Basin (West) Conference, competing against Canyon Ridge, Burley, Jerome, Minico, and Wood River, all located in south central Idaho's Magic Valley.

Twin Falls won the 5A state championship in football in 2004 and in boys' basketball in 2006. After dropping to Class 4A, the Bruins won the boys' state basketball championship in 2010, and the state baseball championship in 2011 and 2014.

The water polo team and bowling team won state championships in 2007. The boys' cross country has won three state titles in a row since 2007, and both golf teams have won many state titles, as well. The Bruin track team won many championships in the 1970s and continue to be a state power. The last state team track championship was in 1997. The boys' soccer team became state champions in 1992, only three years after the team was founded.

State titles
Boys
 Football (1): 2004
 Cross Country (6): fall 1970, 1971, 1976, 2007, 2008; (4A) 2009 
 Soccer (1): 1992 (unofficial until 2000) 
 Basketball (3): 1974, 2006; (4A) 2010 
 Baseball (4): 1988, 1990; (4A) 2011, 2014
 Track (11): 1925, 1928, 1948, 1970, 1971, 1972, 1973, 1975, 1976, 1993, 1997 
 Golf (18): 1956, 1959, 1960, 1963, 1964, 1969, 1970, 1972, 1973, 1981, 1993, 1997, 2005, 2007; (4A) 2011, 2012, 2013, 2014 

Girls
 Cross Country (8): 1974, 1975, 1976, 1977, 1978, 1979, 1981, 2016 
 Track (9): 1971, 1972, 1973, 1976, 1978, 1979, 1980, 1983, 1987 
 Golf (11): 1994, 1995, 1996, 2000, 2001, 2002, 2004, 2005, 2007, 2008, 2009 

Coed
 Tennis (1): 2000

Enrollment
Twin Falls High School's final year as the only regular public high school in Twin Falls was 2008–09. The year also represented the final year Twin Falls High School did not include 9th grade. Beginning in August 2009, both Twin Falls and Canyon Ridge included grades 9 through 12. Twin Falls High School draws its students from the eastern half of the city.

Notable alumni
Keith G. Allred – Columbia and Harvard professor, mediator, 2010 Idaho gubernatorial candidate, Class of 1983
Bruce Bastian – WordPerfect co-founder, Class of 1966
G. Richard Bevan – Idaho Supreme Court justice, Class of 1977
King Block – college football coach, Class of 1947
Logan Easley – professional baseball player
Mark Felt – Watergate informant "Deep Throat", FBI  executive, Class of 1931
H. George Frederickson – president of Eastern Washington University 1977–1987, University of Kansas professor 1987–present, Class of 1952
Bob Martyn – professional baseball player (Kansas City Athletics), Class of 1948
Gary Puckett – pop singer, musician, Gary Puckett and the Union Gap, Class of 1960
Andy Toolson – Utah Jazz NBA player, BYU basketball player, BYU assistant basketball coach, Class of 1984
Cy Sneed – professional baseball player
Allyson Swan – 2004 Miss Rodeo Idaho, 2005 Miss Rodeo America first runner-up, 2006 Miss Idaho USA, Class of 2001
Ralf Youtz – musician, Class of 1990
Paul Durham - musician, lead singer Black Lab, Class of 1986

See also

List of high schools in Idaho

References

External links
 
 TFHSAlumni.com
 TFHS Football
 Twin Falls School District #411

Public high schools in Idaho
Educational institutions established in 1907
Twin Falls, Idaho
Schools in Twin Falls County, Idaho
1907 establishments in Idaho